The following table is a non-exhaustive list of forests found in India.

See also
Lists of forests
Communal forests of India
Protected areas of India
Reserved forests and protected forests of India
Tropical rainforests of India
List of countries by forest area
Sacred groves of India
Forests in Odisha

References

India
 
Forests in India